HMIS Cornwallis (L09) was an  sloop, originally built during World War I and commissioned as HMS Lychnis in the Royal Navy (RN) in 1917. She was transferred to the Royal Indian Marine (RIM) and commissioned as Cornwallis in 1921.

She served during World War II in the Royal Indian Navy (RIN), the successor to the RIM. Her pennant number was changed to U09 in 1940. Although originally built as a minesweeper, she was primarily used as a convoy escort during the war. She was scrapped soon after the end of the war.

History
HMS Lychnis was ordered in December 1916 as a part of the Emergency War Programme of World War I from William Hamilton and Company, Port Glasgow and was launched on 21 August 1917. She commissioned in 1917.  She is credited with sinking the German submarine  by depth charging and shelling on 17 June 1918 in the Mediterranean Sea.

Following the end of the war, she was transferred to the Royal Indian Marine and commissioned as HMIS Cornwallis. In 1934, RIM was renamed Royal Indian Navy. During World War II, she was a part of the Eastern Fleet. She escorted numerous convoys in the Indian Ocean 1942-45.

She was decommissioned and scrapped in 1946, soon after the end of the war.

Notes

References

 

World War I sloops of the United Kingdom
Aubrietia-class sloops
Aubrietia-class sloops of the Royal Indian Navy
1917 ships